Ortospana is a genus of moths of the family Noctuidae. Its only species, Ortospana connectens, is known from Sri Lanka. Both the genus and species were first described by Francis Walker in 1865.

References

Catocalinae
Monotypic moth genera